Chris Haze (born 21 June 1990) is an Irish singer-songwriter, musician and producer. He was born in Galway, Ireland.

He began playing the guitar in 2010 and soon after began writing and releasing his own songs. Haze has toured Ireland with the Original Rudeboys and has supported international hip hop acts like Coolio.

Early life 
Haze grew up in Ballinfolye Co. Galway. With three brothers and a sister, he is the youngest of his family. His father was not around from a young age. His family moved to Westport, County Mayo when he was a child, and he spent a number of years there before returning to Galway when he started secondary school. Haze went to school in St Joseph's College (The Bish) in Galway City. He went on to get his Junior Certificate before leaving school at the age of 16.

Music career

2010–2015: Career beginnings 
In 2011, when he was 20, Haze was living in a house with friends who used to play and produce music. Inspired, he then started watching YouTube videos to learn some guitar chords. He progressed quickly and soon began making his own songs. Haze recorded his first ever guitar riff and lyrics in 2012. This developed into his first song, which he called "World Outside". The song featured an English hip hop artist named Lexeeeee. "World Outside"> received positive feedback from music critics and thousands of views on YouTube, which inspired Haze to decide music was a career he would like to pursue.

In 2013, Haze was nominated by Hot Press magazine on their list of "Hot for 2014". He was nominated again for their readers' poll award as Most Promising Artist of that year.

Since 2014, Haze has performed with a number of major names in the music industry. He has opened for international artists such as Coolio and Sheppard, and toured Ireland with the Irish group The Original Rudeboys, ending in December 2013, where Haze opened their sold-out shows at The Olympia Theatre and The Academy Dublin.

In 2014, Guinness picked Haze to participate in The Guinness Amplify Series, which spotlights and publicises new and upcoming Irish singer-songwriters.

2015–2016: Singles and international airplay 
In 2015, Haze released the single "Don't Wanna Fall Asleep", which generated media interest and radio play across Ireland. He followed with the release of his first EP, titled Thoughts to Words. The EP features "Don't Wanna Fall Asleep" and two other tracks.

Earlier in 2016, Haze released "Let Us Be Heroes", followed by a video for the song. The single received national airplay on RTE 2FM and in the United Kingdom on BBC Radio and Radio X.

Haze's single "I'll Run", released July 2016, also earned airplay on Irish, British and other European radio stations like KX Radio in the Netherlands. The official music video received similar accolades.

2016–2017: We Are One – EP release 
Following the singles "Let Us Be Heroes" and "I'll Run", Haze released an EP called We Are One on 17 February 2017, along with a self-titled single and official video. The EP featured "Let Us Be Heroes" and "I'll Run" along with three new songs. After the first week of sales We Are One came in at number 31 on the IRMA Official Irish Albums chart and at number 2 on the Official Irish Independent Album Chart. We Are One debuted at Number 1 on the Irish singer-songwriter chart and came in at Number 4 on the Official Irish Album Charts on the day of the release (17 February 2017) making this Haze's first official top 5 album and first Irish Number 1 release across various Google and iTunes charts.

2017: Say Goodbye – single Release 
Later in 2017, Haze announced the release of yet another single called "Say Goodbye" which came out 8 September to mark the 1 year anniversary of his single "I'll Run". "Say Goodbye" debuted at Number 1 on the Irish Singer-songwriter Chart and at Number 39 on the Official Irish Singles Charts. This was Haze's third Irish Chart appearance in 12 months Independently and securing him his first Irish Number 1 & Top 40 Single. "Say Goodbye" went on to be the eighth most played Irish Song on Irish Radio the week of the release. "Say Goodbye" also secured Haze his first two appearances on two Official Spotify playlists. A "New Music" playlist and a "New Talent" playlist.

2018: RECIPE – single and EP Release 
In early 2018, Haze used social media to announce the release of 5-song EP entitled "RECIPE", which features the Single "Say Goodbye". The "RECIPE" EP debuted at Number 5 on the Official Irish Album Charts and at Number 2 on the Irish Singer-Songwriter Chart on iTunes as well as reaching Number 7 on the Top Albums Charts, Number 2 on the Singer-Songwriter Chart and Number 1 on the Folk Chart on Google Play Music. Making it Haze's 2nd appearance on the Top 10 Official Irish Album Charts in 24 months among numerous other chart positions across a number of different Genres.

2019: Chasing Rivers – singles and EP Release 
Fresh off the back of his first North American tour in Sep/Oct 2018, Haze arrived home to announce the release of a brand new six-song EP entitled Chasing Rivers which was released 26 April. In the lead up to the release, he released the first self titled Single 'Chasing Rivers' in 22 February and went on to peak at Number 11 on the Official Irish Singles Chart. The second single released from the EP released in March entitled 'So Long' secured another Top 100 Official Irish Single debut at Number 74. The EP was released 26 April and debuted at Number 11 on the Official Irish Album Charts and secured numerous Top 5 positions across a number of Google Play Music Charts.'Chasing Rivers' EP stayed in the Top 10 for over 6 weeks after its release making it the longest Haze spent in the Top 10 of any chart.

2019 - 2020: Time And Space - single and EP 
In 2019, Haze set his sights establishing his own Independent record label, Remody Records. It is a change over and rebranding of his initial record label Chris Haze Music. He then went on to announce the first body of work to be released on his very own label, 'Time And Space' EP.

2020 - 2021: Debut Album Release Of 'Streets In My Mind', 'WDGAF' And 'The Power Of Love' Cover 
After taking to TikTok during the pandemic n 2021, Haze secured a whole new fanbase which lead to him releasing his debut album 'Streets In My Mind'. He then went on to release a controversial single entitled 'WDGAF' which went on to secure Haze his first Official Irish Homegrown Top 20 on the Official Charts. The Irish artist and producer didn't stop there. Haze went on to release an official adaptation of the famous hit 'The Power Of Love' by Frankie Goes To Hollywood.

2021 - 2022: Accepted In The Recording Academy 
Haze was accepted as a member of The Recording Academy as a voting member.

Discography

Extended plays

Singles

References

External links 
 Official website
 Facebook
 "Haze Of Our Lives: Hot Press catches up with Chris Haze" Hotpress Magazine. Retrieved 10 June
 "Galway singer/songwriter Chris Haze dropped in to see us this week, and we were blown away" JOE.ie (2014) Retrieved 27 June
 "Chris Haze set to release new single 'I'll Run' " Hotpress Magazine. (4 Jul 2016) Retrieved 10 July
 "Chris Haze Shares The Video For His New Song ‘I’ll Run’ " I.M.R.O (7 Sep 2016)  Retrieved 19 July
 BBC Radio airplay - Jim Corr, Dave Franco, Chris Haze and Nigel Ringland Retrieved 24 July
 Artist Of The Day – Global Rockstar Magazine (04/03/2016) (archived) Retrieved 30 July
 Artist Of The Week – Global Rockstar Magazine (08/03/2016) (archived) Retrieved 2 Aug
 Artist Of The Month – Global Rockstar Magazine (12/04/2016) (archived) Retrieved 23 Aug

1990 births
Living people
Irish male singer-songwriters
Male guitarists
People from Galway (city)
Acoustic guitarists
Irish composers
Irish record producers
21st-century Irish male singers